Karma.Bloody.Karma is the third studio album by deathgrind band Cattle Decapitation. It was released on July 11, 2006. The track "Total Gore?" features guest vocals from Joey Karam of The Locust. It is the last album to feature drummer Michael Laughlin.

The album cover depicts a figure resembling the Hindu deity Shiva, while the album name refers to karma, a concept attributed to Hinduism, Buddhism, Jainism, Sikhism, and Taoism. In an interview with Aggressive Tendencies, Travis Ryan explained that the album cover was actually a plan B.

Track listing

Personnel

Cattle Decapitation
 Michael Laughlin – drums
 Josh Elmore – guitar, EBow ("Of Human Pride and Flatulence")
 Travis Ryan – vocals
 Troy Oftedal – bass guitar, piano ("Alone at the Landfill")

Additional personnel
 John Wiese – electronics
 Joey Karam – vocals ("Total Gore?"), keyboards ("Total Gore?", "Of Human Pride and Flatulence")
 Billy Anderson - producer

References

2006 albums
Cattle Decapitation albums
Albums with cover art by Wes Benscoter
Albums produced by Billy Anderson (producer)